Trevor railway station was formerly a station on the Ruabon to Barmouth Line in north-east Wales. The line was double track between Ruabon and Llangollen and there was a signal box at Trevor.

According to the Official Handbook of Stations the station handled both goods and passenger traffic in 1956 and the goods yard was equipped with a 3-ton crane.

There were also private sidings from the neighbourbood of the station to the firebrick works in the middle of the village (via a level crossing), and to the Cefn Mawr Monsanto works. The latter also connected to the Pontcysyllte Branch, and via the Rhos Branch eventually rejoined the main line on the outskirts of Wrexham.

Neighbouring stations

References

External links
 Trevor station on navigable 1952 O. S. map

Beeching closures in Wales
Disused railway stations in Wrexham County Borough
Railway stations in Great Britain opened in 1862
Railway stations in Great Britain closed in 1965
1862 establishments in Wales
Former Great Western Railway stations
1965 disestablishments in Wales